"I Feel You" is a UK #8 1993 song by Depeche Mode,  Martin L. Gore, covered Johnny Marr 2015

I Feel You may also refer to:
"I Feel You"' song by	Neil Diamond	 T. Hensley, S. Cole 1992
"I Feel You" (Peter Andre song), a UK #1 1996 song by Peter Andre
"I Feel You" (Sam Roberts Band song), a 2011 song by the Sam Roberts Band
"I Feel You", a 2015 song by the South Korean group Wonder Girls
"Leben… I Feel You", a 2003 song by Schiller